Caloptilia isotoma is a moth of the family Gracillariidae. It is known from Nigeria, Namibia, Zimbabwe and South Africa.

References

isotoma
Lepidoptera of Namibia
Lepidoptera of South Africa
Lepidoptera of West Africa
Lepidoptera of Zimbabwe
Moths of Sub-Saharan Africa
Moths described in 1914